Nasirabad (also Romanized as Naşīrābād; also known as Nāşerābād) is a village in Khorramdarreh Rural District, in the Central District of Khorramdarreh County, Zanjan Province, Iran. At the 2006 census, its population was 2,044, in 473 families.

References 

Populated places in Khorramdarreh County